Pushpendra Nath Pathak "Guddan Pathak" is a Member of Legislative Assembly Madhya Pradesh. He is elected from Bijawar seat in 2013 Madhya Pradesh Legislative Assembly election

Election 2013

Guddan Pathak was a candidate of BJP in 2008 Elections from Maharajpur Assembly Constituency and lost the seat with a marginal difference to Manvendra Singh, an ex-Congress Minister turned as an Independent Candidate. In 2013, pre-election incidents took rapid moves and Manvendra Singh joined BJP and was declared an authorised candidate of BJP from Maharajpur Assembly Constituency. This step inflated the feelings of annoyance in the party workers and a number of protests were done. The Party, then, on the last day of nominations, declared Guddan Pathak, as an authorised party candidate from Bijawar Assembly Constituency. Pushpendra Nath 'Guddan Pathak', who was a new and unknown face for this area, accepted the challenge and started the campaign. The Real-time support from Chief Minister Shivraj Singh Chouhan and 100% dedication of the party workers along with polite, dynamic and clean
image of him resulted in a glorious and historical win.

References

Living people
People from Chhatarpur
1964 births
Madhya Pradesh MLAs 2013–2018
Bharatiya Janata Party politicians from Madhya Pradesh